Bill Klages is an American lighting designer. He won seven Primetime Emmy Awards and was nominated for thirteen more in the category Outstanding Lighting Direction. Klages was honored in the Television Hall of Fame, in 2012.

References

External links 

Living people
People from Long Beach, New York
Year of birth missing (living people)
American lighting designers
Primetime Emmy Award winners